This is a graphical lifespan timeline of prime ministers of Belgium. Fifty-three persons have served as Prime Minister of Belgium since the office came into existence in 1830, although it was named Chief of Government from 1830 until 1918. They are listed in order of office (prime ministers leading nonconsecutive governments are listed in the order of their first premiership).

<div style="overflow:auto">

Sources
Government of Belgium. Library of Parliament. "Prime Minister". Retrieved August 17, 2020

Timeline
Prime Ministers of Belgium
Graphical timelines